Mazandaran's codes are 62, 72, 82 and 92. But 92 is still not in use. In public cars, Taxis and Governal cars the letter is always the same. But in simple cars this letter (ب) depends on the city.

62
62 is Sari county's code and all of the letters are for Sari.

72

82

Road transport in Iran
Transportation in Mazandaran Province